Lyudmila  Vladimirovna Gnilova (born February 12, 1944) is a Russian and Soviet actress and voice actress. She was awarded as a Meritorious Artist (since 1982).

Biography 
Starting from 1964, Gnilova debuted as the role of Lenka in "Dalnie strany" (Distant countries). She worked in the Central Children's theater in Moscow and was the wife of the former actor Alexander Solovyov, until his death in 2000.

Filmography 
Dalnie strany  (1964) - Lenka.
An Easy Life (1964).
Dayte zhalobnuyu knigu  (1964).
Dvadtsat let spustya  (1965).
Give me a complaints book (1965).
Encore, Once More Encore!  (1992) - Barhatova.
Dikiy  (2009) - mother-in-law.

Voice-over roles

Animated films 
Maria, Mirabela.
Glasha and Kikimora.
 Vaniusha and The Giant
The Adventures of Scamper the Penguin - Pepe.
The Blue Bird
AMBA

Dubbing (film and television) 
ALF.
Babel - Amelia (Adriana Barraza).
Bones - Parker Booth (Ty Panitz), Angela Montenegro (Michaela Conlin), and Caroline Julian (Patricia Belcher).
Dynasty - Alexis (Joan Collins).
ER - All female roles.
Grandma's Boy - Bea (Shirley Knight).
Mr. Destiny - Ellen Jane Burrows/Robertson (Linda Hamilton).
Primeval - Ben Trent (Jack Montgomery).
The Race - Madame Jo (Josiane Balasko).
Shallow Ground - Helen Reedy (Patty McCormack).
Sunset Beach - Olivia Richards (Lesley-Anne Down), Annie Douglas Richards (Sarah G. Buxton), and Virginia Harrison (Dominique Jennings).
Terra Nostrea - Anjélica (Paloma Duarte).
The X-Files - Dana Scully (Gillian Anderson) and other female roles.
What Women Want - Dr. J.M. Perkins (Bette Midler).
X-Men Origins: Wolverine - Heather Hudson (Julia Blake).

Dubbing (animated films and cartoons) 
Animaniacs - Dot Warner, Skippy.
Bonkers - Fawn Deer.
DuckTales - Louie, Webby.
Disney's Adventures of the Gummi Bears - Sunni Gummi, Princess Calla.
Gnomeo & Juliet - Ms. Montague.
Howl's Moving Castle - Grandma Sophie.
My Life as a Teenage Robot - Tuck.
Princess Mononoke - San.
Sally the Witch - All children and female roles.
Tales from the Crypt - Old Witch and other female roles.
TaleSpin - Molly Cunningham.
The Simpsons (Season 17) - All female and children roles.

References

External links 
 Lyudmila Gnilova at People's.ru

1944 births
Living people
Soviet film actresses
Soviet voice actresses
Russian film actresses
Russian voice actresses
Russian television actresses
20th-century Russian actresses
21st-century Russian actresses